Members of the New South Wales Legislative Council who served from 1882 to 1885 were appointed for life by the Governor on the advice of the Premier. This list includes members between the elections commencing on 30 November 1882 and the elections commencing on 16 October 1885. The President was Sir John Hay.

See also
Third Parkes ministry
Stuart ministry
First Dibbs ministry

Notes

References

 

Members of New South Wales parliaments by term
19th-century Australian politicians